Francesco Grandelli is an Italian professional boxer. He held the Italian featherweight title twice between 2018 and 2019.

Professional career
Grandelli made his professional debut on 23 May 2015, scoring a four-round points decision (PTS) victory over Marco Iuculano at Pala Hilton Pharma in Ferrara, Italy. He secured two more PTS wins in 2015, against Lorenzo Cali in June and Antonio Sponziello in September, before suffering his first career defeat against Giuseppe Carafa in December via PTS over four rounds.

He began 2016 with a PTS win over Sponziello in a rematch followed by a draw against Dionisie Tiganas, just two weeks apart in May. In July, Grandelli defeated Tiganas in a rematch via third-round technical knockout (TKO) followed by a PTS win over Shoaib Zaman twenty days later. His final fight of 2016 was a PTS win against Carmelo Palermo in November.

After only fighting once in 2017—a TKO victory over Stefan Slavchev in July—Grandelli defeated Emiliano Salvini via unanimous decision (UD) over ten rounds to capture the vacant Italian featherweight title, with the judges scoring the bout 99–91, 99–92 and 98–93. The bout took place on 23 February 2018 at the Teatro Tenda in Grugliasco, Italy. He only fought once more in 2018, securing a UD win over Milan Delic in March.

Following a PTS win over Wallington Orobio in April 2019, Grandelli defeated Nicola Cipolletta by UD over ten rounds to capture the vacant Italian featherweight title for a second time. The bout took place on 5 July in Grugliasco, Italy. Two judges scored the bout 97–92 while the third scored it 98–91. His next fight came against Reece Bellotti for the vacant WBC International Silver featherweight title. The bout took place on 11 October at the PalaTrento in Trento, Italy. Grandelli defeated Bellotti via split decision (SD) to capture the WBC's regional title, with the judges' scorecards reading 96–94 and 96–95 in favour of Grandelli, and 96–95 to Bellotti.

Professional boxing record

References

Living people
Italian male boxers
Sportspeople from Turin
Featherweight boxers
1994 births